Ardestan (also Romanized as Ardestān and Ardistān) is a city and capital of Ardestan County, Isfahan Province, Iran. At the 2006 census, its population was 14,698, in 4,077 families.

Ardestan is located at the southern foothills of the Karkas mountain chain and is 110 km northeast of Isfahan. It is believed the city has been founded in Sassanian times and was strongly fortified in the 10th century. A Seljuk-era mosque, a bazaar, several ab anbars, and historical houses of the old town are among the tourist attractions of Ardestan. Mulberry, pomegranate and a special kind of fig are the main orchard products of the town.

It has been said that the birthplace of Hassan Modarres.

Historical sites
 Imamzadeh Husayn: This Seljuk imamzadeh possibly made part of a Seljuk madrasah. Only little of this structure remains today. A badly damaged portal with the remains of a minaret (originally two) can still be found.
 Imamzadeh Ismael
 Jameh Mosque of Ardestan: The oldest parts indicate a pre-Seljuk building, and it is possible the mosque was built on the site of a chahar taq. The structure was incorporated in a Seljuk kiosk mosque in the 12th century, and further expanded to the classical four-iwan plan. The stucco decoration of the mihrab was altered during the Il-Khanid period.

Climate
Ardestan has a hot desert climate (Köppen: BWh).

Historical places

References

 Matheson, Sylvia A. (1972). Persia: An Archaeological Guide. London: Faber and Faber Limited. 
yektamob

External links

 Photographs of Ardestan:
— Masjed-e Jāme'eh Ardestān: (1), (2), (3), (4), (5), (6), (7), (8),  (9), (10), (11).

  

Populated places in Ardestan County
Cities in Isfahan Province